In Taiwan, parliamentary elections are held every four years to elect the 113 members of the Legislative Yuan, the unicameral legislature of Taiwan. The current electoral system was introduced in 2008. The constitutional amendments of 2005 extended term length from three to four years, reduced seat count from 225 to 113, and abolished the National Assembly, originally another governmental organ equivalent to a chamber of parliament.

Current electoral system 
Members are elected by parallel voting:
 73 members by first-past-the-post in single-member districts
 6 by single non-transferable voting in multi-member districts, exclusive for persons with indigenous status
 34 by party-list proportional representation voting

Single-member constituencies 
The delimitation of the single-member constituencies within the cities and counties was initially a major political issue in the early years, with bargaining between the government and the legislature. Of the 15 cities and counties to be partitioned (the ten others have only one seat), only seven of the districting schemes proposed by the CEC were approved in a normal way. The eight other schemes were decided by drawing lots: "Taipei and Taichung cities and Miaoli and Changhua counties will adopt the version suggested by the CEC, while Kaohsiung city will follow the consensus of the legislature. Taipei county will follow the proposal offered by the opposition Taiwan Solidarity Union, Taoyuan county will adopt the ruling Democratic Progressive Party's scheme, and Pingtung county will use the scheme agreed upon by the Non-partisan Solidarity Union, People First Party, Kuomintang and Taiwan Solidarity Union."

Demographic data is obtained by investigation of household registration and should be compiled two years and two months before the tenure of current legislators end. The Central Election Commission reviews the boundaries, then submits any proposed alterations to the Legislative Yuan 20 months before the election for final consent and announcement.

Indigenous districts 
Six seats are reserved for indigenous peoples. They are elected by single non-transferable vote in two 3-member constituencies for lowland aborigines and highland aborigines respectively. This system did not fulfil the promise in the treaty-like document A New Partnership Between the Indigenous Peoples and the Government of Taiwan, where each of the 13 recognised indigenous peoples was to get at least one seat, and the distinction between highland and lowland abolished.

Party-list 
Seats are allocated using the largest remainder method with the Hare quota which, with 34 seats, is 2.9412%. A party's vote share must exceed a threshold of 5% to win any seats. Votes for parties which do not pass the threshold are first excluded. The vote share for the remaining parties are calculated. A party is allocated one seat for every 2.9412% of votes. The remaining seats are allocated in succession to the party with the largest remainder.

For each party, at least half of the legislators elected under this system must be female. Therefore, with an odd number of seats, females will always outnumber males.

List of Legislative Yuan elections

Early parliamentary elections

Supplementary elections
According to the interpretation of the Judicial Yuan, under the original constitution the National Assembly, Legislative Yuan, and Control Yuan were seen to constitute the Parliament in Taiwan. After 20 years of relocating the government to Taiwan, the Kuomintang-led government of the Republic of China amended the Temporary Provisions against the Communist Rebellion to start limited parliamentary elections. The elected members served together with existing members elected by the 1947 Chinese National Assembly election, the 1948 Chinese legislative election, and the 1947-1948 Chinese Control Yuan election in the respective chambers.

National Assembly supplementary elections

Legislative Yuan supplementary elections

Control Yuan supplementary elections
Supplementary members of the Control Yuan were indirectly elected by the provincial legislatures.

National Assembly elections
Following the constitutional reforms in the 1990s, elections for the National Assembly in its entirety was conducted. The chamber was streamlined in 2000 and became fully defunct in 2005.

See also
 Legislative Yuan constituencies
 Politics of Taiwan
 Presidential elections in Taiwan
 Elections in Taiwan

References

 1
Taiwan